In the 2018–19 season, JS Kabylie competed in the Ligue 1 for the 48th season, as well as the Algerian Cup.

Pre-season
Following the conclusion of the 2018–19 campaign, JS Kabylie announced they would play Saarbrücken, Hertha Wiesbach, Hamm Benfica and FV Lebach in July 2018.

Mid-season

Overview

{| class="wikitable" style="text-align: center"
|-
!rowspan=2|Competition
!colspan=8|Record
!rowspan=2|Started round
!rowspan=2|Final position / round
!rowspan=2|First match	
!rowspan=2|Last match
|-
!
!
!
!
!
!
!
!
|-
| Ligue 1

|  
| style="background:silver;"| Runners–up
| 11 August 2018
| 26 May 2019
|-
| Algerian Cup

| colspan=2| Round of 64 
| colspan=2| 18 December 2018
|-
! Total

Ligue 1

League table

Results summary

Results by round

Matches

Algerian Cup

Squad information

Playing statistics

|-

|-
! colspan=12 style=background:#dcdcdc; text-align:center| Players transferred out during the season

Goalscorers
Includes all competitive matches. The list is sorted alphabetically by surname when total goals are equal.

Squad list
As of August 11, 2018.

Transfers

In

Out

References

2018-19
JS Kabylie